Henry S. LeBlanc (September 4, 1865 – September 4, 1946) was a merchant and political figure in Nova Scotia, Canada. He represented Yarmouth County in the Nova Scotia House of Assembly from 1897 to 1911 as a Liberal member.

Early life
He was born in East Pubnico, Nova Scotia, the son of Andrew LeBlanc and Marie Ann Pothier.

Career
LeBlanc served as a member of the municipal council for Argyle. He was a member of the province's Executive Council from 1906 to 1911. He was named to the Legislative Council of Nova Scotia in 1920 and served until the Council was abolished in 1928. LeBlanc was Inspector of Old Age Pensions for Yarmouth County from 1933 until his death in 1946.

Death
He died in Yarmouth on September 4, 1946 at the age of 81.

Personal life
He was married twice: to Agnes d'Entremont in 1891 and later to Theresa A. d'Eon.

References 
 A Directory of the Members of the Legislative Assembly of Nova Scotia, 1758-1958, Public Archives of Nova Scotia (1958)

1865 births
1946 deaths
Nova Scotia Liberal Party MLAs
Nova Scotia Liberal Party MLCs
People from Yarmouth County
Acadian people